James Bowie High School may refer to:

 Bowie High School (Arlington, Texas)
 Bowie High School (Austin, Texas)
 James Bowie High School (Simms, Texas)

See also 
 Bowie High School (disambiguation)